Nidhi is an Indian actress who works in Hindi television serials and Bhojpuri language films. She has appeared in Balika Vadhu, Crime Patrol, Sapne Suhane Ladakpan Ke, Adaalat, Encounter, Beintehaa, Savdhaan India and Aahat (season 6).

Television
Colors TV's Balika Vadhu and Beintehaa
Sony TV's Crime Patrol, Adaalat, Encounter, Aahat (season 6) and Sankatmochan Mahabali Hanuman
Zee TV's Sapne Suhane Ladakpan Ke
ZEE TV's Doli Armaano Ki as Nidhi Khanna
Life OK's Savdhaan India as Dimple (Episode 293) / Sona Bhushan (Episode 450) / Divya (Episode 580) / Niyati Patel ( Episode 739) /  Sunita (Episode 892) / Riya Gupta (Episode 1134) / Ayesha (Episode 1244).
&TV's Kuldeepak
Sab TV Taarak Mehta Ka Oolta Chashmah

Filmography

Awards

References

External links
 

Living people
Indian television actresses
Actresses from Mumbai
Actresses in Hindi television
Year of birth missing (living people)
Actresses in Bhojpuri cinema